Eric Cosmin Bicfalvi (born 5 February 1988) is a Romanian professional footballer who plays as an attacking midfielder or a forward for Russian Premier League club Ural Yekaterinburg.

Bicfalvi began his senior career with Fink Fenster Petrești in the Romanian third tier, and went on to amass over 100 appearances in the Liga I for Jiul Petroșani, FC Steaua București and Gloria Buzău combined. He moved abroad for the first time by joining Ukrainian team Volyn Lutsk in 2012, where he was top scorer of the national league in the 2014–15 season. After brief spells in China and back to Romania, Bicfalvi has played in Russia since 2016.

Bicfalvi has been a full Romania international since November 2014, making his debut in a 2–0 friendly win over Denmark. He previously represented the nation at under-19 and under-21 levels.

Club career

In 2005, Bicfalvi began his senior career in the Romanian third division with Fink Fenster Petrești, where he spent one year. During this period, he made 23 appearances and scored nine goals for the club. The following season he moved to Liga I side Jiul Petroșani. After the team was relegated, he was signed by FC Steaua București on a five-year deal.

In 2012, as his contract expired he subsequently joined Ukrainian club Volyn Lutsk. Bicfalvi ended the 2014–15 Ukrainian Premier League season as joint-top scorer with 17 goals, which earned him a transfer to Liaoning Whowin in the Chinese Super League on 7 July 2015.

He did not adapt to life in China and after a brief spell with Dinamo București, the cross-town rival of his former club Steaua, he put pen on a contract with Tom Tomsk, newly promoted to the Russian Premier League.

On 23 January 2017, he signed a two-and-a-half-year contract with another Russian first division side, Ural Yekaterinburg. Bicfalvi was chosen as Russian Premier League player of the month for May 2022 after scoring 4 goals in 4 games during the month.

International career
Bicfalvi is a former Romania youth international, representing the nation at under-19 and under-21 levels.

In August 2013, after not being convoked by the Romania senior team on any occasion, his agent announced that Bicfalvi would like to play for Hungary in the near future.

However, Romania senior manager Anghel Iordănescu named him as a possible call-up for the next UEFA Euro 2016 qualifier against Northern Ireland in November 2014. On 18 November that year, Bicfalvi made his full debut in a friendly with Denmark.

Personal life
Bicfalvi's paternal grandfather, Alexander Bicfalvi/Sándor Bikfalvi was also a footballer and played for Victoria Carei. He was ethnic Swedish according to Gazeta Sporturilor and Hungarian according to Nemzeti Sport, while Eric's mother, Elisabeta/Erzsébet, is of Hungarian heritage.

Career statistics

Club

International

Scores and results list Romania's goal tally first, score column indicates score after each Bicfalvi goal.

Honours
Steaua București
Cupa României: 2010–11

Dinamo București
Cupa României runner-up: 2015–16

Ural Yekaterinburg
Russian Cup runner-up: 2016–17, 2018–19

Individual
Ukrainian Premier League top scorer: 2014–15 (17 goals)

References

External links
 
 
 
 

1988 births
People from Carei
Romanian sportspeople of Hungarian descent
Romanian people of Swedish descent
Living people
Romanian footballers
Romania youth international footballers
Romania under-21 international footballers
Romania international footballers
Association football midfielders
Association football forwards
CSM Jiul Petroșani players
FC Steaua București players
FC Gloria Buzău players
FC Volyn Lutsk players
Liaoning F.C. players
FC Dinamo București players
FC Tom Tomsk players
FC Ural Yekaterinburg players
Liga I players
Liga II players
Liga III players
Ukrainian Premier League players
Ukrainian Premier League top scorers
Chinese Super League players
Russian Premier League players
Romanian expatriate footballers
Expatriate footballers in Ukraine
Romanian expatriate sportspeople in Ukraine
Expatriate footballers in China
Romanian expatriate sportspeople in China
Expatriate footballers in Russia
Romanian expatriate sportspeople in Russia